Allium therinanthum or summer garlic is a species of garlic that is found in the Mount Hermon area in Israel.

See also
 List of Allium species

References

therinanthum
Plants described in 2014
Flora of Israel